Dinner at Eight may refer to:

The play and its adaptations
 Dinner at Eight (play), a 1932 Broadway play written by George S. Kaufman and Edna Ferber
 Dinner at Eight (1933 film), a 1933 adaptation
 Dinner at Eight (1989 film), a made-for-television adaptation starring Lauren Bacall
 Dinner at Eight (opera) by William Bolcom

Television
 Come Home Love: Dinner at 8, a 2016 Hong Kong sitcom
 "Dinner at Eight" (Frasier), an episode of the American sitcom Frasier
 "Dinner at Eight" (Falcon Crest), an episode of the American soap opera Falcon Crest
 "Dinner at Eight", an episode of the Canadian sitcom The Newsroom

Other
 "Dinner at Eight" (song), a song by Rufus Wainwright from his album Want One
 Dinner at Eight (album), a 1986 album by American keyboardist and composer Wayne Horvitz

See also
 "Dinner at Eight-ish", an episode of the American sitcom Cheers